The Västerås Ladies Open is a women's professional golf tournament on the Swedish Golf Tour and LET Access Series, played since 2018 in Västerås, Sweden.

Between 2018 and 2021 the tournament was hosted by U.S.-based Anna Nordqvist, a multiple major championship winner with roots in nearby Eskilstuna. 

In 2022 the tournament moved from Västerås Golf Club to Orresta Golf Club. Lynn University Sophomore Sara Ericsson won on the first extra hole in a play-off with New Zealand's Hanee Song.

Winners

See also
Västerås Open – men's event (Challenge Tour)

References

External links

LET Access Series events
Swedish Golf Tour (women) events
Golf tournaments in Sweden